The following is a list of songs produced by Sam Sneed.

Production discographies

Hip hop discographies

Discographies of American artists